Gunnar "Spökis" (The Ghost Pilot) Andersson (August 1, 1923 - December 19, 1974) was a famous Swedish aviator who was dedicated to developing the mountain-aviation in Scandinavia.

He started out as a radio-seller in remote areas. Later he made numerous search-and-rescue operations in the Swedish mountains earning him his nickname "The Ghost Pilot" as he could often not be seen due to the low visibility - only the engine could be heard - and then he showed up as a ghost to save people when nobody else would even consider flying.

He died on 19 December 1974 in Medelpad, Sweden in a helicopter crash.

He founded the company Jämtlands Flyg AB in 1954.

References

External links
Image gallery from photographer Lars-Göran Stomberg
Historical image gallery from Jämtlands Flyg

1923 births
1974 deaths
Aviators killed in aviation accidents or incidents
Swedish aviators
Victims of aviation accidents or incidents in 1974
Victims of aviation accidents or incidents in Sweden
Victims of helicopter accidents or incidents